Young Mr. Bobbin is an American television situation comedy that aired live on the NBC network during the 1951-1952 season.

Synopsis
The series stars Jackie Kelk as Alexander Hawthorne Bobbin, a young high school graduate who lived with his maiden aunts and was in love with the girl next door, Nancy (Pat Hosley). Nydia Westman and Jane Seymour co-star as Bobbin's aunts. The series was canceled after one season.

References

External links

1951 American television series debuts
1952 American television series endings
1950s American sitcoms
American live television series
Black-and-white American television shows
English-language television shows
NBC original programming